Koča's frontier ( / Kočina krajina) refers to the Serbian territory established in the Sanjak of Smederevo, Ottoman Empire, during the Austro-Turkish War (1788–1791) in the 1788 . The Habsburg-organized Serbian Free Corps, among whom  Koča Anđelković was a prominent captain (hence the historiographical name), initially held the central part of the sanjak, between February and September 7, 1791; after the Austrians entered the conflict the territory was expanded and became a Habsburg protectorate under military administration, called Serbia. After the Austrian withdrawal and Treaty of Sistova (1791), the territory was regained by the Ottomans.

Background

Serbs
The Serbs had taken an active part in the wars fought in the Balkans against the Ottoman Empire, and also organized uprisings. Because of this, they suffered persecution and their territories were devastated. Major migrations from Serbia into Habsburg territory ensued.

Habsburg-Russian alliance
Due to conflicts around Caucasus in 1786, relations between Russia and the Ottomans soured. The next year, Joseph II and Catherine II met in Crimea for the second time, which prompted the Ottomans to declare war on Russia. In the meantime, the Austrians prepared the Serb refugees for war.

History

Koča's frontier rebellion

 
A Serbian Free Corps of 5,000 soldiers had been established in Banat, composed of refugees that had fled earlier conflicts in the Ottoman Empire. The Corps would fight for liberation of Serbia and unification under Habsburg rule. The main commander was the Austrian major Mihailo Mihaljević. Among volunteers were Aleksa Nenadović, Stanko Arambašić, Karađorđe Petrović, the prominent Radič Petrović and most of all, Koča Anđelković. The Austrians used the Corps in two failed attempts to seize Belgrade, in late 1787 and early 1788.

The Austrians entered this war in February 1788, though they had by now lost their best chance for an easy victory. The slow preparations of Russia resulted in the Ottoman concentration on Belgrade. The Austrians relied on Russian support in Moldavia, which only began in late 1788, and Joseph II seemed to have been reluctant to fight the Ottomans. In July, the Ottomans crossed the Danube and broke into Austrian Banat. Shortage of supplies struck both sides, while disease struck the Austrian soldiers. As many as 50,000 Serb refugees flooded across the Danube, causing logistical problems for the Austrians. In mid-August, Joseph II dispatched 20,400 soldiers into Banat.

Habsburg occupation

On 8 October 1789, Ernst Gideon von Laudon took over Belgrade. Austrian forces occupied Serbia, and many Serbs fought in the Habsburg free corps, gaining organization and military skills. The occupation was accompanied by the Catholic Church which sought to convert the Orthodox Serbs, which made the Serbs look to Russia for aid after the Ottoman regaining of the area in 1791.
By 1791 however the Austrians (the Habsburg) were forced into withdrawal across the Danube and Sava rivers, joined by thousands of Serbian families who feared Ottoman persecution. The Treaty of Sistova ended the war.

Aftermath
After the war, the Ottomans gave rights to the Serbs to collect local taxes. The displaced janissaries, excluded from the Ottoman Army following reorganization, sought refuge in Serbia (Sanjak of Smederevo) where they tried to revoke the rights granted to the Serbs. These renegade janissaries, called dahije, murdered as many as 150 Serb leaders (knezovi), sparking the First Serbian Uprising (1804). The leader of the uprising, Karađorđe Petrović, had earlier served in the Austrian army as a volunteer during the Habsburg occupation. The uprising expanded into the Serbian Revolution (1804–17), which saw the de facto independence of Serbia.

Legacy
An annual manifestation, the "Days for Koča's Frontier" (Дани Кочине крајине), takes place in Jagodina and Kladovo in honour of the rebellion.

See also

 Habsburg-occupied Serbia (disambiguation)
 Battle of Mainz, neutral Serbian observers

References

Further reading

 
 
 
 
 
  
 
 
 
 
 
 

Rebellions against the Ottoman Empire
Conflicts in 1788
Wars involving the Ottoman Empire
1780s in the Ottoman Empire
18th century in Serbia
Ottoman Serbia
Serb rebellions
Serbia under Habsburg rule
Habsburg Serbs
1788 establishments in the Habsburg monarchy
1792 disestablishments in the Habsburg monarchy
Austro-Turkish Wars
Occupation of Serbia
1790s in Serbia
1780s in Serbia